Xestia palaestinensis is a moth of the family Noctuidae. It is found in Greece, south-eastern Turkey, Lebanon, Israel, Syria, Jordan, northern Iraq and western Iran.

Adults are on wing from September to November. There is one generation per year.

External links
 Noctuinae of Israel

Xestia
Moths of Europe
Moths of Asia